Peter Curtis (born 13 January 1933) is a former  Australian rules footballer who played with North Melbourne in the Victorian Football League (VFL).

Curtis won the 1951 South West Football League (New South Wales) senior football best and fairest award, the Gammage Medal.  

Curtis later transferred to play with Griffith Football Club in 1953, then with North Albury Football Club in the Ovens & Murray Football League in 1954.

Notes

External links 

Living people
1933 births
Australian rules footballers from New South Wales
North Melbourne Football Club players
North Albury Football Club players